Lisbon is the 11th most populous urban area in the European Union, with a population of 2.7 million. City and its metropolitan area has four skyscrapers above  and total about 20 skyscrapers above . Nearly ten buildings were built in the last few years, after 2000. Most buildings are offices, the rest are hotels and residential buildings. Several high-rise buildings are located in the Parque das Nações. The tallest building in Lisbon is the Monsanto Tower.

Tallest buildings 

The list includes buildings (above ) in the city of Lisbon and its metropolitan area.

Tallest under construction – approved and proposed

Gallery

References

External links 

 Emporis.com report for Lisbon
 Skyscraperpage.com report for Lisbon

Lisbon

Lisbon-related lists